Drumcoltran Tower is a late-16th-century tower house situated in the historical county of Kirkcudbrightshire  near Kirkgunzeon, Dumfries and Galloway.

Like other towers in the area, Drumcoltran was built by a branch of the Maxwell family around 1570 but passed with the estate to the Irvings in 1668. The Maxwells however constructed the existing farm steading and made alterations to the interior of the tower in the 18th century.

It was designated a scheduled ancient monument in 1928.

References

 Coventry, Martin (2001) The Castles of Scotland, 3rd Ed. Scotland: Goblinshead  
Maxwell-Irving, A. M. T. (2000) The Border Towers of Scotland, Creedon Publications

External links
Historic Environment Scotland: Visitor guide

Castles in Kirkcudbrightshire
Castles in Dumfries and Galloway
Scheduled Ancient Monuments in Dumfries and Galloway
Historic Scotland properties in Dumfries and Galloway
Tower houses in Scotland